Vermont Route 111 (VT 111) is a state highway in the U.S. state of Vermont. The highway runs  from VT 105 in Derby east to VT 114 in Brighton. VT 111 connects the incorporated village of Derby Center in eastern Orleans County with Morgan and the central Essex County town of Brighton.

Route description
VT 111 begins at an intersection with VT 105 (Main Street) in the incorporated village of Derby Center. incorporated village of Derby Center. The two-lane highway heads east and passes to the south of Lake Derby. VT 111 veers southeast and crosses Green Brook and Orcutt Brook before passing through the southwest corner of Holland. The highway continues through the town of Morgan, in which the highway follows the shore of Lake Seymour between its crossings of the Lake Seymour inlet and Sucker Brook. VT 111 crosses Webster Brook before entering the town of Brighton, where the highway crosses the Pherrins River immediately before reaching its eastern terminus at VT 114 (Norton Road).

Major intersections

References

111
Transportation in Orleans County, Vermont
Transportation in Essex County, Vermont
Derby, Vermont
Brighton, Vermont